Tributary may refer to the following:

Tributary, a stream or river which flows into another river (a parent river) or body of water but which may not flow directly into the sea
Tributary (ballet) by Robert La Fosse and Robert Garland, 2000
Tributary, Georgia, an unincorporated community in Douglas County
Tributary port, a locally terminated network connection in a (synchronous optical networking) transport network
Tributary state